Yusuf Tunaoğlu  (1 January 1946 – 22 July 2000) was a Turkish former international footballer and sports writer.

Career
Yusuf Tunaoğlu started to play football at the age of 8. Tunaoğlu started to play club football at Beşiktaş J.K in 1958, where he was promoted to senior team at the age of 17 in 1962–63 season. In June 1970, Tunaoğlu was linked with Belgian side Anderlecht. Tunaoğlu retired from professional football in 1976.

Yusuf Tunaoğlu represented Turkey, making 6 appearances between 1964 and 1971.

With support from senior sports writer, İslam Çupi, Yusuf Tunaoğlu joined Turkish nationwide newspaper Milliyet as a sports writer in 1987.

Style of play and reception
Yusuf Tunaoğlu is regarded as an "unforgettable player" by Beşiktaş J.K. His former teammate Sanlı Sarıalioğlu described his style "magical" whereas his other former teammate Vedat Okyar once expressed about him: "While playing alongside [him], sometimes I was stopping to play for a moment and ruminating as watching him play. This great football talent [Tunaoğlu] astonished everybody".

During his professional career, Tunaoğlu possessed renown attributes of vision on pitch, playmaking, precision passing and ball control. He also possessed a high level upper body strength.

Death and legacy
Tunaoğlu died due to cardiac arrest in Kuşadası on 22 July 2000. He was buried in Zincirlikuyu Cemetery. Since then, Tunaoğlu is commemorated annually by Beşiktaş J.K. representatives upon his grave.

In 2001, a charity game held after Tunaoğlu's name where former Big Three players competed at a single-game 6-on-6 teams honorary tournament, including former Beşiktaş players Mehmet Ekşi, Rıza Çalımbay, Metin Tekin, Ziya Doğan, Cem Pamiroğlu, Uğur Tütüneker and Özcan Kızıltan held at Süleyman Seba Hall in Fulya, Beşiktaş.

In 2009, owned by Ministry of Youth and Sports, Yusuf Tunaoğlu Stadium with 2,500 seating capacity was opened in Ayazağa Neighbourhood of Sarıyer District, Istanbul.

On 16 October 2019, Beşiktaş J.K. announced "Yusuf Tunaoğlu Football Directorate" is openened at Nevzat Demir Facilities of the club, located in Ümraniye, Istanbul.

Achievements
 Beşiktaş J.K
 Süper Lig (2): 1965–66, 1966–67
 Turkish Super Cup (1): 1966–67
 TSYD Cup (4):  1964–65, 1965–66,  1971–72, 1972–73

 Turkey
 ECO Cup (1): 1969

Individual
Beşiktaş J.K. Squads of Century (Golden Team)

Filmography

References

External links
Profile at Turkish Football Federation

1946 births
2000 deaths
Footballers from Istanbul
Association football midfielders
Turkish footballers
Turkey international footballers
Süper Lig players
Beşiktaş J.K. footballers
Altay S.K. footballers